Highet is a surname, and may refer to:

 Alex Highet (c. 1914 – 1940), Scottish footballer 
 Allan Highet (1913–1992), New Zealand politician
 Fiona Highet, Scottish entomologist
 Gilbert Highet (1906–1978), Scottish classicist
 Harry Highet (1892–1989), New Zealand engineer 
 John Highet (1886–1950), Scottish footballer 
 Thomas Highet (1853–1907), Scottish footballer

See also

 
 Highett (disambiguation)